Barbella is an Italian surname. Notable people with the surname include:

Costantino Barbella (1853–1925), Italian sculptor
Emanuele Barbella (1718–1777), Italian classical composer
Maria Barbella (1868–1902), the second woman sentenced to die in the electric chair

See also
 Barbella (1954 film), a Bengali-language film directed by Kalpataru

Italian-language surnames